Bandolera is a Spanish daily television series starring Marta Hazas. Produced by Diagonal TV, it aired from January 2011 to January 2013 on Antena 3.

Premise 
The fiction follows the adventures of Sarah Reeves (Marta Hazas), a student of Hispanic Philology from the University of Oxford who arrives to the Andalusian village of Arazana in 1882, and involves in a love triangle, featuring brigandage, the birth of the Guardia Civil and the rise of anarchist initiatives in the countryside as some of the backdrop elements.

Cast

Production and release 
Bandolera was produced by Diagonal TV for Antena 3. The first episode of the series premiered in prime time on 10 January 2011 in order to get exposure, and it was subsequently moved to the sobremesa slot for its daily broadcasting. The second season aired from 1 September 2012 to 11 January 2013. The full broadcasting run comprised 532 episodes. The series increased its viewership figures each year of broadcasting. The last episode, filmed in November 2012, aired on 11 January 2013, with a "good" 15.3% audience share.

References 

2011 Spanish television series debuts
2013 Spanish television series endings
Television series set in the 1880s
Television shows set in Andalusia
2010s Spanish drama television series
Television series about bandits
Spanish adventure television series
Spanish television soap operas
Antena 3 (Spanish TV channel) network series
Spanish-language television shows
Television series by Diagonal TV